Pérez is a surname of either Spanish or Hebrew origin (including a list of persons with the name).

Pérez or Perez may also refer to:

Places
 Pérez, Santa Fe, Argentina, a city
 Perez, Quezon, a municipality in the Philippines
 Pérez Pérez, a Cuban village of Camagüey Province
 Cape Perez, Graham Land, Antarctica
 Perez Peak, Graham Land, Antarctica
 Mount Perez, Oates Land, Antarctica
 Perez Glacier, Ross Dependency, Antarctica

People
 Perez (given name) (including a list of persons with the name)

Others 
 Perez., 2014 Italian film

See also
 Pérès, French surname (including a list of persons with the name)
 Peres, a surname (including a list of persons with the name)
 Peretz, a surname (including a list of persons with the name)
 Pirez (disambiguation)
 Píriz, a surname